Benzophosphole is the organic compound with the chemical formula C8H7P; it is the phosphorus analog of indole. The term benzophosphole also refers to substituted derivatives of the parent heterocycle.

See also 
 Organophosphorus chemistry
 Phosphole
 Indole

References

Phosphorus heterocycles
Heterocyclic compounds with 2 rings
Simple aromatic rings